TDL may refer to:

Businesses and organizations
 Technical Design Labs, a former microcomputer- and software company
 Texas Digital Library, a consortium of institutions
 TDL Group, former company name of Tim Hortons

Places
 Tokyo Disneyland, Japan
 Tandil Airport (IATA code), Argentina
 Tundla Junction railway station (Station code), India

Technology
 Tactical Data Link, in military communication
 Top-level domain (TLD), of the Internet

Other uses
 Tomodachi Life, a 2013 life simulation video game
 Toxic Dose Low, in toxicology
 Sur language (ISO 639-3 code: tdl), a Plateau language of Nigeria

See also
 Temporal difference learning (TD), a prediction method
 Tunneled Direct Link Setup (TDLS)
 Two Dimensional Logarithmic Search (TDLS)
 Tunable diode laser absorption spectroscopy (TDLAS)